Everybody Knows is a 2018 Spanish-language mystery/crime drama film written and directed by Iranian filmmaker Asghar Farhadi, and starring Javier Bardem, Penélope Cruz and Ricardo Darín. The film was selected to open the 2018 Cannes Film Festival in competition and was released in Spain on 14 September 2018. It was released in the United States on 8 February 2019.

Plot
The story follows Laura, a Spanish woman living in Buenos Aires, who returns with her teenage daughter Irene and young son Diego to her small hometown just outside Madrid for her younger sister's wedding. Laura runs into her old friend Paco in the town square while Irene flirts with a local teenage boy named Felipe. After dancing with Felipe at the wedding reception, Irene complains that she does not feel well and goes upstairs to sleep. Later that night, Laura goes to check on Irene only to find she is missing. She receives a text message from kidnappers urging the family to pay a large sum or they will kill Irene.

The family decides not to involve the local police for Irene's safety, as the kidnappers will kill Irene if the police get close. Laura receives a text message demanding €300,000 against the release of her daughter. Chaos ensues as the family scrambles to raise the money. During a heated confrontation with Laura's father Antonio, Paco learns that some family members believe he "owes" them money, as the land Paco's vineyards were built on was sold to him by Laura at below market rate because he was the child of the family's servants. Laura's brother-in-law, Fernando, calms the situation and brings in his friend Jorge, a retired police officer, for consultation. During a private conversation, Jorge tells Laura that she should include members of her family on her suspect list, including her husband. Desperate to help, Paco considers selling his lands to a business partner so he can pay Irene's ransom but his wife Bea advises against it. She reveals that she has been receiving the same text messages as Laura on her phone.

Laura's husband, Alejandro, is informed of the kidnapping and arrives in town. He receives a cold welcome by Laura's family before going with Laura, Paco, and Fernando to meet Jorge, who asks to talk to Alejandro alone. Alejandro becomes very upset when Jorge mentions that Laura discussed his past problems with alcoholism and his ongoing bankruptcy. Enraged by how a stranger knows this information, Alejandro leaves with Laura and they argue about the best course of action. Laura confesses to Paco that Irene is his biological daughter, conceived sixteen years prior during Laura's trip to her hometown shortly after she and Alejandro married. Shocked by this information, Paco readies to sell his estate, but Bea angrily refutes Laura's claim. She believes Laura is lying about Irene's paternity and might be involved in the kidnapping herself in order to get money out of Paco. He leaves the house anyway and comes back hours later with a duffel bag containing the ransom money. After examining Irene's upstairs room, Jorge tells Alejandro and Laura that whoever kidnapped Irene knew that Paco was her father. During a conversation with Fernando, Alejandro learns that the whole family, along with some of the townsfolk, know that Irene is not his biological daughter because of her resemblance to Paco.

That night, Laura's niece Rocío sneaks out of the house and travels to an abandoned, run-down building on the outskirts of the town. Once there, she meets with her estranged husband Gabriel and his accomplice Luis. It is revealed that all three of them orchestrated Irene's kidnapping and that Gabriel has been sending the ransom messages to Laura. Luis admits that he is the one who has been sending the same ransom messages to Bea, unbeknownst to Gabriel. This angers Gabriel and prompts a crying Rocío to beg for her husband to let Irene go; their collective actions have deviated too far from the original plan and caused irreparable damage. Despite Luis's protests, Gabriel agrees to let Irene go at dawn. Rocío returns home and is questioned by her mother Mariana, Laura's older sister, as to her whereabouts. Rocío brushes her mother off, leaving Mariana suspicious.

At dawn, Paco receives a voice recording of Irene begging for her rescue and a text message of where to perform the exchange. He grabs the duffel bag and drives to the destination. Once he arrives, Paco gets out of his car and rushes to inspect a loud noise made by something large being tossed into a nearby river. When he returns to his car, he finds Irene tied up in the backseat and the bag missing. He delivers Irene to Laura and Alejandro, who rush Irene to a hospital. Exhausted, Paco returns home, only to find that Bea has left him.

Shortly afterwards, Laura and her family pack their belongings and say goodbye to the family as they will be returning to Argentina. Felipe promises to call Irene when she gets home. In the car, Irene asks Alejandro why it was Paco who rescued her. He does not answer. As the car drives off, Mariana sits by herself in the town square. She calls over her husband, Fernando, and asks him to sit down. As the two begin to converse, the screen fades to white.

Cast
Penélope Cruz as Laura, Mariana and Ana’s sister, Alejandro’s wife, Irene and Diego's mother, and Antonio’s daughter
Javier Bardem as Paco, Bea’s husband
Ricardo Darín as Alejandro, Laura’s husband and Irene and Diego's father
Bárbara Lennie as Bea, Paco’s wife
Inma Cuesta as Ana, Laura's younger sister, Irene’s aunt, Joan’s fiancée, and Antonio’s daughter
Elvira Mínguez as Mariana, Laura's older sister, Irene’s aunt, Fernando’s wife, Antonio’s daughter, and Rocío's mother
Eduard Fernández as Fernando, Mariana's husband and Rocío's father
Ramón Barea as Antonio, Ana, Mariana, and Laura's father and Irene’s grandfather
Sara Sálamo as Rocío, Fernando's and Mariana's daughter
Carla Campra as Irene, Laura's and Alejandro's daughter, Antonio’s granddaughter, Ana and Mariana’s niece
Roger Casamajor as Joan, Ana's fiancé 
José Ángel Egido as Jorge, a retired policeman
Sergio Castellanos as Felipe, a young local boy and Irene's friend
Jaime Lorente as Luis, a young local barber
Paco Pastor Gómez as Gabriel, Rocio´s estranged husband
Iván Chavero as Diego, Laura and Alejandro's son, Antonio's grandson, Ana and Mariana's nephew
Jordi Bosch

Production
The film is a French-Spanish-Italian co-production and received funding from Canal+, Eurimages, France Télévisions, Ciné+, ICAA, and Movistar, among others.

Principal photography started in August 2017.

Release
The film had its world premiere at the Cannes Film Festival on 8 May 2018. Shortly after, Focus Features acquired distribution rights to the film in various territories. It also screened at the Toronto International Film Festival on 8 September 2018.
 It was released in Spain on 14 September 2018. It was released in the United States on 8 February 2019.

Reception

The Critics Consensus says: "Everybody Knows is somewhat less than the sum of its parts despite the efforts of an outstanding cast - and a disappointing step back for writer-director Asghar Farhadi." On the aggregator Metacritic, the film has a weighted average score of 68 out of 100, based on 16 critics, indicating "generally favorable reviews".

Writing for The A.V. Club, A. A. Dowd gave the film a B rating, saying that "Javier Bardem and Penélope Cruz help break Cannes' opening-night curse". Australian film site This Is Film similarly awarded the film a positive review, with contributing critic Peter Gray stating it was “an absorbing, expertly-crafted thriller that continually holds your emotions at ransom”.

Awards and nominations 

|-
| rowspan = "29" | 2019 || rowspan = "2" | 24th Forqué Awards || Best Actor || Javier Bardem ||  || rowspan = "2" | 
|-
| Best Actress || Penélope Cruz || 
|-
| rowspan = "6" | 6th Feroz Awards || colspan = "2" | Best Drama Film ||  || rowspan = "6" | 
|-
| Best Actor (film) || Javier Bardem || 
|-
| Best Actress (film) || Penélope Cruz || 
|-
| Best Supporting Actor (film) || Eduard Fernánez || 
|-
| Best Supporting Actress (film) || Bárbara Lennie || 
|-
| Best Trailer || || 
|-
| rowspan = "8" | 74th CEC Medals || colspan = "2" | Best Film ||  || rowspan = "8" | 
|-
| Best Director || Asghar Farhadi || 
|-
| Best Actor || Javier Bardem || 
|-
| Best Actress || Penélope Cruz || 
|-
| Best Supporting Actor || Eduard Fernández || 
|-
| Best Supporting Actress || Bárbara Lennie ||  
|-
| Best Original Screenplay || Asghar Farhadi || 
|-
| Best Editing || Hayedeh Safiyari || 
|-
| rowspan = "8" | 33rd Goya Awards || colspan = "2" | Best Film ||  || rowspan = "8" | 
|-
| Best Director || Asghar Farhadi || 
|-
| Best Original Screenplay || Asghar Farhadi || 
|-
| Best Actor || Javier Bardem || 
|-
| Best Actress || Penélope Cruz || 
|-
| Best Supporting Actor || Eduard Fernández || 
|-
| Best Editing || Hayedeh Safiyari || 
|-
| Best Original Song || "Una de esas noches sin final" by Javier Limón || 
|-
| rowspan = "3" | 28th Actors and Actresses Union Awards || Best Film Actor in a Leading Role || Javier Bardem ||  || rowspan = "3" | 
|-
| Best Film Actress in a Leading Role || Penélope Cruz || 
|-
| Best Film Actress in a Minor Role || Elvira Mínguez || 
|-
| rowspan = "2" | 6th Platino Awards || Best Actor || Javier Bardem ||  || rowspan = "2" | 
|-
| Best Actress || Penélope Cruz || 
|}

See also 
 List of Spanish films of 2018
 List of French films of 2018

References

External links
 
 
 
 
 

2018 films
2018 crime drama films
2018 crime thriller films
2018 thriller drama films
2010s mystery drama films
2010s mystery thriller films
2010s Spanish-language films
Films about child abduction
Films directed by Asghar Farhadi
Films scored by Alberto Iglesias
Films set in Spain
French crime drama films
French crime thriller films
French mystery drama films
French mystery thriller films
French thriller drama films
Italian crime drama films
Italian crime thriller films
Italian mystery drama films
Italian mystery thriller films
Italian thriller drama films
Morena Films films
Spanish crime drama films
Spanish crime thriller films
Spanish mystery drama films
Spanish mystery thriller films
Spanish thriller drama films
2010s Spanish films
2010s French films